Louisa "Lou" Jo Killen (born Louis Killen; 10 January 1934 – 9 August 2013) was an English folk singer from Gateshead, Tyneside, who also played the English concertina. 

Killen formed one of Britain's first folk clubs in 1958 in Newcastle upon Tyne, and became a professional folk singer in 1961. In the 1970s Killen recalled: "When I started Folk Song and Ballad in Newcastle in 1958 there weren't twenty folk clubs in the whole country, and when I left for the States (in 1966) there were maybe three hundred." Recordings of Killen singing some Tyneside songs were included on both  The Iron Muse (Topic Records 12T86, 1963) and the revised version on CD (Topic Records TSCD465) issued in 1993. The accompanying book to the Topic Records 70 year anniversary boxed set Three Score and Ten has a dust jacket picture featuring Killen with Frankie Armstrong; and one of the songs featured on both albums of The Iron Muse, The Blackleg Miners is track six of the sixth CD in the set.

Killen emigrated to the United States in 1967 and worked with Pete Seeger before joining The Clancy Brothers. In 1971, the Clancy Brothers brought in the singer who had introduced the English concertina to the music mix, Lou Killen. They recorded two studio albums on the Audio Fidelity label: Save the Land and Show Me the Way. Their next, and final, album for Audio Fidelity was a live album, Live on St. Patrick's Day in 1973, recorded the previous year at the Bushnell Auditorium in Hartford, Connecticut. In the mid 1970s Killen left the Clancys. 

A few years before Killen's death, she underwent a gender reassignment to become Louisa Jo.

Killen died in 2013, at the age of 79.

Discography
Killen's solo recordings
 Bright Shining Morning Front Hall FH 006 (1975)	
 Old Songs, Old Friends Front Hall FH 012 (1978)
 Steady as She Goes Collector 1928
 The Iron Muse Topic Records 12T86 (1963); TSCD465(1993)
 Sea Chanteys ESP-Disk' ESP 1085 (1968; 1994)
 Tommy Armstrong of Tyneside Topic Records 12T122 (1965; 1997)
 Ballads and Broadsides Topic Records 12T126 (1965; 2009)
 Gallant Lads Are We Smithsonian Records 1932 (1980) 	
 Sea Songs Smithsonian Folkways FTS 37311 (1979)
 50 South to 50 South Seaport SPT-102 (1972) 	
 (with Johnny Handle) Along the Coaly Tyne Topic Records 12T189 (1971)

Lou Killen, Paddy Clancy, Tom Clancy, and Liam Clancy
Show Me The Way Audio Fidelity Records (1972)
Save the Land! Audio Fidelity Records (1972)
Live on St. Patrick's Day Audio Fidelity Records (1973)
The Clancy Brothers' Greatest Hits Vanguard Records (1973) - Vanguard LP/CD
This was reissued as 'Best of the Vanguard Years' with bonus material from the 1982 Live! album with Bobby Clancy and Robbie O'Connell.

References

External links

1934 births
2013 deaths
People from Gateshead
Musicians from Tyne and Wear
English folk singers
English folk musicians
Place of death missing
Audio Fidelity Records artists
British LGBT singers
English LGBT musicians
Transgender women musicians
Transgender singers
The Clancy Brothers members